Aliabad-e Lishtar (also Romanized as Ali Abad-e Līshtar; also known as Aliabad, Līshtar, Līshtar-e ‘Arabhā, Līshtar-e Bālā, and Līshtar Sardār) is a village in Lishtar Rural District, in the Central District of Gachsaran County, Kohgiluyeh and Boyer-Ahmad Province, Iran. At the 1986 census, its population was 664, in 121 families.

References 

Populated places in Gachsaran County